Jakob Saar (14 April 1886, in Pala Parish, Tartu County – 24 February 1950, in Tartu) was an Estonian politician. He was a member of III Riigikogu.

References

1886 births
1950 deaths
Members of the Riigikogu, 1926–1929
Members of the Riigikogu, 1929–1932